The Henderson Home News was a community newspaper based in Henderson, Nevada. The Henderson Home News had a close, working alliance with the larger Las Vegas Sun throughout its existence. The Las Vegas Sun later acquired the Henderson Home News outright and closed the smaller newspaper in 2010.

Lorna Kesterson worked as a reporter and, later, managing editor of the Henderson Home News for nearly thirty years. She was later elected the first female Mayor of Henderson in 1985.

References

Publications disestablished in 2010
Newspapers published in Nevada
Mass media in Henderson, Nevada